Mariah Suzanne Carbone is an American geophysicist who is a  professor of Geosciences at the Center for ecosystem science and society, Northern Arizona University. She studies terrestrial ecosystems and how they respond to environmental change.

Early life and education 
Carbone was an undergraduate student at Wesleyan University where she played women's soccer for the Wesleyan Cardinals. She moved to the University of California, Irvine for doctoral research, supervised by Susan Trumbore. Her thesis investigated ecosystem respiration and the residence time of the products of photosynthesis.

Research and career 
Carbone studies how terrestrial ecosystems respond to environmental change, and how these ecosystems impact the Earth's climate. She makes use of isotope tracers to understand carbon cycling through plants and soils. This allows Carbone to understand how increasing levels of carbon dioxide will influence terrestrial ecosystems. Investigating the fate of carbon in terrestrial ecosystems with temporal and spatial resolution allows Carbone to unravel the molecular mechanisms of different geological processes at local and global scales. She combines field research with computational analysis to understand carbon distribution amongst plants, subterranean carbon dioxide fluxes and the relationships between carbon and water. To investigate these phenomena, Carbone primarily uses radioactive isotopic tracers (e.g. measurements of carbon-14, which can be used to characterize the age of carbon) and accelerator mass spectrometry.

Carbon in plants 
Carbon is formed during photosynthesis and contributes to growth, metabolism, and above- and below-ground structures. Before the work of Carbone, it was unclear about how plants allocate this carbon. She is also interested in the role of non-structural carbon (i.e. carbon in sugars and lipids). She measures the concentrations of non-structural carbon and uses bomb pulse approaches to understand the age of this carbon. Bomb pulse refers to the rapid rise, sharp peak and exponential decline of Carbon-14 that occurred during the 1950s/1960s due to above ground nuclear weapons testing.  Variations in Carbon-14 can provide information on molecular biosynthesis since 1955. Using this approach, Carbone has studied ancient redwood trees in California. Through this work she looks to understand the amount of non-structural carbon in resilience to wild fires.

Subterranean carbon dioxide fluxes 
To better understand the contributions of above- and below-ground sources to carbon dioxide flux, Carbone develops process-based models. Below-ground, these sources include soil respiration. Until Carbone's work, it was difficult to measure this respiration at high frequencies, or to understand how flux impacts biotic and abiotic processes.

Carbon – water relationships 
Carbone's research investigates the relationships between water cycle and carbon cycle.

Selected publications

References 

Living people
University of California, Irvine alumni
Wesleyan University alumni
Northern Arizona University faculty
American geophysicists
21st-century American scientists
American women scientists
Year of birth missing (living people)
21st-century American women scientists